Ernestina Lecuona y Casado (16 January 1882 – 3 September 1951) was a Cuban pianist, music educator and composer.

Life
Ernestina Lecuona y Casado was born in Matanzas into a musical family. Her brother was pianist and composer Ernesto Lecuona. Leo Brouwer, a classical guitarist, is her grandson, and gymnast-political scientist Rafael A. Lecuona, an anti-communist, was her nephew. She studied music at the Centro Asturiano de La Habana and with French teacher Lucía Calderón.

At the age of 15, Lecuona completed her first work Habanera Luisa, which was published widely in Cuba and Spain by Anselmo López in 1897. She gave early music lessons to her brother Ernesto, and in 1936 was invited to New York City by the Pan American Union, where she accompanied the Mexican tenor Tito Guizar. She made contact with singer Jessica Dragonette, who added some of Lecuona's works to her repertoire.

In 1937 she founded a women's orchestra in Cuba, which debuted at the Teatro Alkazar, and in 1938 performed in concerts at the National Theatre. In 1939 she toured Mexico, Chile and Argentina and in 1940-42 traveled to South America again. She traveled with her brother on tour, and sometimes played with him as a duo for four hands at radio stations and concert venues including Carnegie Hall in 1948. She died in Havana.

Works
Selected works include:
Bolero
Amarte es mi destino
Anhelo besarte
Mi sueño eres tú
Mi vida es soñar
No lo dudes
¿Por qué me dejaste?
Te has cansado de mi amor
ú serás en mis noches
Tus besos de pasión
Ya que te vas
Canción-bolero
Ahora que eres mío
Te has cansado de mi amor
Canción

References

External links
"Ahora que eres mia" by Ernestina Lecuona - performed by Juan Arvizu from YouTube

1882 births
1951 deaths
19th-century classical composers
19th-century women composers
19th-century Cuban musicians
19th-century Cuban educators
19th-century women educators
20th-century classical composers
20th-century women composers
20th-century pianists
20th-century Cuban musicians
20th-century Cuban educators
20th-century women educators
Cuban classical composers
Cuban pianists
Cuban women pianists
Cuban music educators
Women classical composers
Women music educators
People from Matanzas
19th-century women pianists
20th-century women pianists